KWRM (1370 kHz, iCiti Radio Los Angeles) is a commercial AM radio station that broadcasts a Chinese language News radio format. It is owned by James Y. Su, through licensee EDI Media, Inc. The station is licensed to Corona, California.  The transmitter is located on Radio Road in Corona.

History
Most of KWRM's programming is in Mandarin Chinese. However, there are some English-language shows, especially sports events and talk shows.  Some Spanish-language shows also are heard.

KWRM is the current flagship station of the Orange County Flyers of the Golden Baseball League. In the past, the station has carried the Rancho Cucamonga Quakes California League baseball and the baseball and basketball teams of Cal State Fullerton, Cal State Long Beach, and UC Irvine.

In the 1980s the station was co-owned by Pat Boone and played syndicated content, Big Band format along with locally produced talk shows such as "Call the Chief" hosted by the station manager Pat Michaels and produced by Randall Vorisek. Some of this content simultaneously aired on 95.1 FM KQLH which was KWRM's sister station.   The Corona station had a small production studio that produced these and that also produced content solely for KQLH.  Early 1980's broadcasters included station manager Pat Michaels, program director Marlon Pailey, John Drapo and Randall Vorisek who also engineered for the live Sunday broadcasts in Spanish.

This station became time-brokered in the mid-1990s.

In the mid-2000s, KWRM was often referred to as "The Worm" covering high-school football programs that featured future NCAA and NFL stars, as well as collegiate and professional baseball. The Worm also carried the USC Trojans college football for several seasons. In the Summer of 2005, KWRM began producing several sport talk shows, including the show "Controversy." Controversy was hosted by then Assistant Sports Director Roman Valdez, along with Aaron Toller and Jaeson Zinke. All three doubled as play-by-play announcers on KWRM produced and broadcast games.

In April 2020 the station filed an STA with the FCC to go silent while it seeks a new transmitter towers location. Its long-time towers erected adjacent to the 91/15 freeways interchange have been removed. An FCC record dated April 14, 2020 says the station is "licensed and silent.".

Previous logo

References

External links 

WRM
Mass media in Orange County, California